Justice Burnett or Burnet may refer to:
E. C. Burnett III, associate justice of the South Carolina Supreme Court
George H. Burnett, chief justice of the Oregon Supreme Court
Hamilton S. Burnett, associate justice of the Tennessee Supreme Court
Jacob Burnet, associate justice of the Supreme Court of Ohio
John Burnett (judge), associate justice of the Oregon Supreme Court
Peter Hardeman Burnett, associate justice of the Supreme Court of California